Joe Visciano is an American Grammy Award-winning, mixing engineer and audio engineer, based in Brooklyn, New York, United States.

Recognition 
2015 Grammy Winner Album of the Year, Morning Phase, Beck
2015 Grammy Winner Best Engineered Album, Non Classical, Morning Phase, Beck
2015 Grammy Winner Best Rock Album, Morning Phase, Beck
2017 Grammy Winner Record of the Year, 25, Adele
2017 Grammy Winner Album of the Year, 25, Adele
2021 Grammy Nomination Album of the Year, Montero, Lil Nas X
2021 Grammy Nomination Album of the Year, Planet Her, Doja Cat
2021 Grammy Nomination Record of the Year, "Kiss Me More", Doja Cat

Selected Credits

References

External links

Living people
American record producers
1990 births